Abrostola was a town of ancient Phrygia, inhabited during Roman times. 

Its site is unlocated but is in the vicinity of Amorium and Pessinus.

References

Populated places in Phrygia
Former populated places in Turkey
Roman towns and cities in Turkey
Lost ancient cities and towns